Pua is a district (amphoe) in the central part of Nan province, northern Thailand.

Geography
Neighboring districts are, from the north clockwise, Chiang Klang, Thung Chang, Chaloem Phra Kiat, Bo Kluea, Santi Suk, and Tha Wang Pha.

Doi Phu Kha National Park is Thailand's largest national park, covering several districts of Nan Province. The national park office as well as the 1,980 m high Doi Phu Kha in the Luang Prabang Range itself are within Pua District.

Administration

Central administration 
Pua is divided into 12 sub-districts (tambons), which are further subdivided into 107 administrative villages (mubans).

Missing numbers belong to tambon which are now part of Bo Kluea District.

Local administration 
There are two sub-district municipalities (thesaban tambons) in the district:
 Pua consisting of sub-district Pua and parts of the sub-districts Sathan, Chai Watthana, Wora Nakhon.
 Sila Laeng consisting of sub-district Sila Laeng.

There are 10 sub-district administrative organizations (SAO) in the district:
 Ngaeng consisting of sub-district Ngaeng.
 Sathan consisting of parts of sub-district Sathan.
 Sila Phet consisting of sub-district Sila Phet.
 Uan consisting of sub-district Uan.
 Chai Watthana consisting of parts of sub-district Chai Watthana.
 Chedi Chai consisting of sub-district Chedi Chai.
 Phu Kha consisting of sub-district Phu Kha.
 Sakat consisting of sub-district Sakat.
 Pa Klang consisting of sub-district Pa Klang.
 Wora Nakhon consisting of parts of sub-district Wora Nakhon.

Economy
Pua district is heavily agricultural. It is a significant maize-growing area. Farmer's zeal to clear more land for maize cultivation has led to deforestation of vast tracts of hillsides, resulting in "bald mountains". A by-product of the land clearing is smoke from field burning, contributing to the northern region's significant air pollution. Charoen Pokphand (CP) Group, Thailand's largest agro-industrial and food conglomerate, and the leading purchaser of Pua District maize, in March 2016 announced an "agricultural social enterprise" to steer district villagers away from maize farming. CP Group has incurred criticism for the way it purchases maize harvests for animal feed from farmers in Nan and other provinces. Suphachai Chearavanont, vice-chairman of CP Group, said that corn planters will be encouraged to grow cash crops such as coffee, which requires less farmland and makes a higher profit than maize. Not only will this address the bald-mountain problem, he said, but it will also help reduce the spring haze in the north which is caused by slash-and-burn practices to prepare land for the next maize season. Mr Suphachai said crops like coffee take about three-and-a-half years to show a yield, but stated that CP Group would stand by farmers and provide assistance in the meantime.

Gallery

References

External links

amphoe.com (Thai)

Pua